Jahadi  is a village development committee located at the southwest corner of Jagdishpur Reservoir, in Kapilvastu District in the Lumbini Zone of southern Nepal. At the time of the 1991 Nepal census it had a population of 4324 people living in 708 individual households.

References

Populated places in Kapilvastu District